Rabia Sultan ("spring",  died 14 January 1712) was the Haseki Sultan of Sultan Ahmed II of the Ottoman Empire. She was the last woman to have the Haseki title.

As imperial consort
Since, Muazzez Sultan, the mother of Sultan Ahmed had died in 1687 before his accession to the throne in 1691, Rabia assumed the position of the highest ranking female member of the royal family with the title of "Senior Consort".

On 6 October 1692, she gave birth to twin sons, Şehzade Ibrahim and Şehzade Selim in the Edirne Palace. Following their birth, Ahmed presented her the mansion of Bayburtlu Kara Ibrahim Pasha located in Kuzguncuk. Şehzade Selim died in May 1693.

On 11 November 1692, she was given the title of "Haseki Sultan". Rabia was the last woman in history to have this title. After Ahmed II death, the mains consorts of next Sultans were entitled as Kadın, a not esclusive and less prestigious title. Kara Mustafa Pasha, who had been executed in 1683, had left a large amount of assets which had been enlisted in the imperial treasury. In December 1692, diamond froggings from these assets ended up on Rabia's fur coat. She also received a diamond crown from the same assets.

In January 1694, Rabia attended the wedding of Ümmi Sultan, daughter of Mehmed IV, and Silahdar Çerkes Osman Pasha. On 23 October 1694, she gave birth to her third child and only daughter, Asiye Sultan. Following her birth, Ahmed granted her lands in Aleppo.

Gevherhan Sultan, daughter of Sultan Ibrahim, and Rabia's sister-in-law, is understood to have been in great debt, as is demonstrated by Topkapı Palace archives dating 28 November 1694, a substantial amount of which was owed to Rabia.

Some of the debts mentioned were covered by the allocation of Gevherhan's grants from her hass, that is revenue-producing estates to Asiye Sultan, the infant daughter of  Ahmed and Rabia, as shown in archives dating 1 December 1694.

Widowhood and death
Rabia was widowed following Ahmed's death in February 1695. On 7 March, her son Şehzade Ibrahim, was put in the care of Valide Sultan Gülnuş Sultan, whereas she and her daughter Asiye were sent to the Old Palace in Istanbul, where Asiye died in December 1695.

Rabia Sultan died on 14 January 1712 in the Old Palace, and was buried beside her husband in the mausoleum of Suleiman the Magnificent, Süleymaniye Mosque, Istanbul.

Her son, Şehzade Ibrahim, who became heir apparent in 1703, after Sultan Ahmed III's accession to the throne, outlived her by two years, dying in 1714.

Issue
Together with Ahmed, Rabia had three children, two twins sons and a daughter:
Şehzade Ibrahim (Edirne Palace, Edirne, 6 October 1692 – Topkapı Palace, Istanbul, 4 May 1714, buried in Mustafa I Mausoleum, Hagia Sophia), twin with Selim, became Crown Prince on 22 August 1703;
Şehzade Selim (Edirne Palace, Edirne, 6 October 1692 – Edirne Palace, Edirne, 15 May 1693, buried in Sultan Mustafa Mausoleum, Hagia Sophia), twin with Ibrahim;
Asiye Sultan (Edirne Palace, Edirne, 23 October 1694 – Eski Palace, Bayezid, Istanbul, 9 December 1695, buried in Suleiman I Mausoleum, Süleymaniye Mosque);

See also
Ottoman Imperial Harem
List of consorts of the Ottoman sultans

References

Sources

17th-century consorts of Ottoman sultans
1670 births
1712 deaths
18th-century consorts of Ottoman sultans